Weber (or ;) is a surname of German origin, derived from the noun meaning "weaver". In some cases, following migration to English-speaking countries, it has been anglicised to the English surname 'Webber' or even 'Weaver'.

Notable people with the surname include:

Disambiguation of common given names with this surname 
 Arthur Weber (disambiguation), several people
 Ben Weber (disambiguation), several people
 Bruce Weber (disambiguation), several people
 Bruno Weber (disambiguation), several people
 Carl Weber (disambiguation), several people
 Charlie Weber (disambiguation), several people
 Charles Weber (disambiguation), several people
 Christiane Weber (disambiguation), several people
 David Weber (disambiguation), several people
 Ernst Weber (disambiguation), several people
 Friedrich Weber (disambiguation), several people
 Georg Weber (disambiguation), several people
 George Weber (disambiguation), several people
 Gerard Weber (disambiguation), several people
 Gottfried Weber (disambiguation), several people
 Heinrich Weber (disambiguation), several people
 John Weber (disambiguation), several people
 Karl Weber (disambiguation), several people
 Ludwig Weber (disambiguation), several people
 Marc Weber (disambiguation), several people
 Max Weber (disambiguation), several people
 Max Weber (1864–1920), German political economist and sociologist
 Michel Weber (disambiguation), several people
 Otto Weber (disambiguation), several people
 Paul Weber (disambiguation), several people
 Pete Weber (disambiguation), several people
 Richard Weber (disambiguation), several people
 Robert Weber (disambiguation), several people
 Steven Weber (disambiguation), several people
 Werner Weber (disambiguation), several people

Academic 
 Albrecht Weber (1825–1901), German Indologist and historian
 Alfred Weber (1868–1958), German economist, sociologist and theoretician of culture
 Beda Weber (1798–1859), German professor, author, and politician
 Caroline Weber (author) (1969), American historian
 Eugen Weber (1925–2007), French historian
 Francis J. Weber, American Catholic scholar
 Hans Hermann Weber (1896–1974), German biochemist and physiologist
 Hermann Weber (1928-2014), German historian and political scientist
 Ingeborg Weber-Kellermann (1918–1993), German folklorist, anthropologist and ethnologist
 Marianne Weber, sociologist and women's rights activist
 Shlomo Weber (born 1949), Russian economist
 Theodor Weber (1836–1906), German theologian and professor of philosophy

Arts 
 Alain Weber (1930–2019), French composer
 Albert Weber Sr. (1829–1879), musician and founder of the Weber Piano Company
 Albert Weber Jr. (1858–1908), Son of Albert Weber Sr. and 2nd president of the Weber Piano Company
 Anna Weber (1814–1888), Canadian Mennonite Fraktur artist
 Bertha Weber (1887-1967) American composer and organist
 Carl Maria von Weber (1786–1826), German composer
 Carlo Weber (born 1934), German architect
 Chris Weber (born 1966), American musician
 Eberhard Weber (born 1940), German musician
 Henrik Weber (1818–1866), Hungarian portrait painter
 Joan Weber (1935–1981), American popular music singer
 Joseph Miroslav Weber (1854-1906) Czech composer and violinist
 Josepha Weber (1758–1819), German soprano
 Jon Weber (musician) (born 1961), American jazz pianist and composer
 Kem Weber (1889–1963), German furniture and industrial designer, architect, and teacher
 Michael Weber (1966–1999), Australian musician; lead guitarist of rock band Seminal Rats

Business 
 Gerhard Weber (designer) (1941–2020), German fashion designer and entrepreneur

Entertainment 
 Amy Weber (born 1970), American actress, model, film producer, and former professional wrestling valet
 Billy Weber, American film editor
 Clark Weber, American radio personality in Chicago
 Dreya Weber, American actress
 Jacques Weber (born 1949), French actor, director and writer
 Jake Weber (born 1964), English actor
 Joe Weber (vaudevillian) (1867–1942), part of comic double-act Weber and Fields
 Lois Weber (1881–1939), American silent film actress
 Steven Weber (born 1961), American actor, voice actor, comedian and singer

Finance 
 Axel A. Weber (born 1957), German economist, former president of the Deutsche Bundesbank

Literature 
 Anne Weber, German-French author
 Katharine Weber (born 1955), American novelist
 Ken Weber (1943–2007), American journalist and nature writer
 Lenora Mattingly Weber (1895–1971), American young-adult author

Mathematics 
 Eduard Ritter von Weber (1870–1934) German mathematician

Politics 
 Albert J. Weber (1859–1925), Associate Justice and Chief Justice of the Utah Supreme Court
 Becky Weber (born 1954), American politician
 Carmen Weber (1945–2007), first wife of former Chilean President Ricardo Lagos
 Ed Weber (born 1931), U.S. Representative from Ohio
 Gabi Weber (born 1955), German politician
 Gérard Weber (1948–2016), French politician
 Gerald J Weber (1914–1989), American judge and military officer
 Helene Weber (1891-1962), German politician
 Henri Weber (1944–2020), French politician
 Johann Weber (1828-1878), Swiss politician
 Manfred Weber (born 1972), German politician
 Olivier Weber (born 1958), French writer, novelist and journalist, ambassador of France, former war correspondent
 Randy Weber, U.S. Representative from Texas
 Renate Weber, Romanian lawyer and human rights activist
 Ricardo Lagos Weber (born 1962), Chilean lawyer and politician, son of former president Ricardo Lagos and Carmen Weber
 Rosa Weber Brazilian judge
 Vin Weber (born 1952), U.S. Representative from Minnesota

Religion 
 Johann Weber (bishop) (1927-2020), Austrian Roman Catholic bishop

Science 
 Ann E. Weber, American chemist
 Frédéric Albert Constantin Weber (1830-1903), French botanist
 Frederick Parkes Weber (1863–1962), English dermatologist; son of Hermann David Weber
 Georg Heinrich Weber (1752–1828), German botanist
 Heinrich Friedrich Weber (1843–1912), German physicist, sometimes confused with Heinrich Martin Weber
 Joseph Weber (1919–2000), American physicist; developed the laser and gravitational wave detector
 Mary Ellen Weber (born 1963), American former astronaut'
 Neal A. Weber (1908–2001), American entomologist
 Weber (unit) is the SI unit of magnetic flux
 Wilhelm Eduard Weber (1804–1891), physicist and telegraphy pioneer, after whom the SI unit of magnetic flux is named
 William Alfred Weber (1918-2020), American botanist and professor; originator of herbarium acronyms

Sport 
 Adam Weber (born 1987), American football player
 Alson Weber (1910–2005), Canadian volleyball player
 Anthony Weber (born 1987), French footballer
 Brianté Weber (born 1992), American basketball player in the Israeli Basketball Premier League
 Caroline Weber (gymnast) (born 1986), Austrian rhythmic gymnast
 Craig Weber (born 1974), Professional boxer
 Darren Weber (born 1972), Zimbabwean cricketer
 Garrett Weber-Gale (born 1985), American swimmer, two-time Olympic gold medalist, world record-holder in two events
 Gerd Weber (born 1956), German footballer
 Gerard Weber (born 1938), Dutch football player and manager
 Gerard Weber (born 1941), Dutch football player
 Hartmut Weber (born 1960), German sprinter
 Heiko Weber (born 1965), German football manager
 Heribert Weber (born 1955), Austrian football player
 Javier Weber (born 1966), Argentinian volleyball player
 Josip Weber (born 1964), Croatian-Belgian footballer
 Jozef Weber, Czech football player and manager
 Julian Weber, German javelin thrower
 Manuel Weber (born 1985), Austrian football player
 Marco Weber (born 1982), German speed skater
 Mauricio Weber (born 1982), Uruguayan football player
 Mike Weber (born 1987), American ice hockey player
 Mike Weber (American football) (born 1997), American football player
 Philipp Weber (born 1992), German handballer
 Ralf Weber (born 1969), German footballer
 Regina Weber (born 1963), German rhythmic gymnast
 Renê Weber aka Renê Carmo Kreutz Weber (born 1961), Brazilian footballer and coach
 Ryan Weber (born 1990), American professional baseball pitcher
 Shea Weber (born 1985), professional ice hockey defenceman
 Wally Weber (1903–1984), American football player
 Willi Weber (born 1942), German manager of Formula One driver, Michael Schumacher
 Wolfgang Weber (born 1944), German former footballer
 Yannick Weber (born 1988), Swiss ice hockey player

Weber/Mozart family 
 Relatives by marriage to Wolfgang Amadeus Mozart
 Constanze Weber, Mozart's wife
 Aloysia Weber, her sister
 Josepha Weber, her sister
 Sophie Weber, her sister
 Cäcilia Weber, their mother
 Carl Maria von Weber composer; cousin of the Weber sisters
 Max Maria von Weber, civil engineer; son of Carl Maria von Weber

See also 
 Webber (surname), an English variant
 Weaver (disambiguation), an English variant
 Wever (disambiguation), a Dutch variant
 Bruno Weber Park, a sculpture garden in Switzerland
 Ritter von Weber, an aristocratic Bavarian family

German-language surnames
Occupational surnames

fr:Weber